Jennifer Jackson (30 January 1952 – 8 August 2015) was a Canadian speed skater. She competed in the women's 1500 metres at the 1972 Winter Olympics.

References

1952 births
2015 deaths
Canadian female speed skaters
Olympic speed skaters of Canada
Speed skaters at the 1972 Winter Olympics
Speed skaters from Winnipeg
20th-century Canadian women